Kizilajlo or Kizil-Ajlo is a village of nearly 7,300 residents (2014) in Georgia’s southern Marneuli Municipality (Kvemo Kartli region). Kizilajlo is the second largest village in the municipality after Sadakhlo. It is a so called independent village (სოფელი, sopeli) that is not part of a grouped community (თემი, temi). 

Kizilajlo is rather inconspicuous in the shadow of the city of Marneuli, but the suburban village is notorious for violence, intimidation and fraud during election time.

Demographics 
Kizilajlo had a population of 7,291 according to the 2014 census. Apart from a few dozen Georgians and Armenian, the village is mono-ethnic Azerbaijani (99.4%).

Sights  
The 19th century mosque in Kizilajlo was granted the status of a cultural heritage monument in March 2012 by decree of the Georgian Minister of Culture and Monument to legally protect its historical and cultural value.

Transport  
The road of international importance S6 (E117) passes through Kizilajlo. This road connects Tbilisi via Marneuli and Bolnisi with the Armenian border at Guguti. This is also the only connection for the village to other places.

The railwayline Marneuli - Bolnisi - Kazreti passes through the village, but has no station here. The line is also no longer in use for passenger traffic. The nearest station is in Marneuli, from where trains depart for Tbilisi, Sadakhlo and Yerevan.

See also 
Azerbaijanis in Georgia
Fakhralo
Tamarisi

References

Populated places in Marneuli Municipality